II is the second studio album by American rapper Kurious. It was released on Amalgam Digital on June 30, 2009.

Track listing

References

External links

2009 albums
Kurious albums
Albums produced by 88-Keys
Albums produced by Dame Grease
Albums produced by Domingo (producer)
Albums produced by Hi-Tek